Richard Kelly (1910–1977) was an American lighting designer, considered one of the pioneers of architectural lighting design. Kelly had already established his own New York-based lighting practice in 1935 before enrolling at the Yale School of Architecture. He graduated from there in 1944. Kelly characterized the difficulty in selling lighting consultancy, then a new discipline, when he reflected, "There weren't lighting consultants then. Nobody would pay for my ideas, but they would buy fixtures."

By the 1950s, his work in lighting design led him to coin the terms 'focal glow', 'ambient luminescence' and 'play of brilliants' to describe particular effects in lighting design. His later career also saw him lecture at Yale, Princeton, and Harvard University.

After his death, the Illuminating Engineering Society of North America established the Richard Kelly Grant in his name to encourage creativity in lighting among young people.

Notable projects
Richard Kelly's most notable projects saw him collaborate with architects including Mies van der Rohe, Philip Johnson, Eero Saarinen, and Louis Kahn. Such lighting projects include:
David H. Koch Theater (then the New York State Theater).
Glass House.
Kimbell Art Museum.
Seagram Building.
Flamengo Park.

External links
Biography from Archlighting.com
 MetropolisMag article on Richard Kelly's work
Website of the Richard Kelly Grant
The Structure of Light, a 2010 Book from Yale Press
Richard Kelly: Defining a Modern Architecture of Light
Richard Kelly papers (MS 1838). Manuscripts and Archives, Yale University Library.

References

American lighting designers
Lighting designers
1910 births
1977 deaths
Yale School of Architecture alumni